The red-tailed leaflove (Phyllastrephus scandens) is a species of leaflove in the bulbul family, Pycnonotidae. It is found in western and central Africa.

Taxonomy and systematics
Although originally described in the genus Phyllastrephus, the red-tailed leaflove was briefly transferred to the former genus Pyrrhurus (now subsumed into Phyllastrephus) during the period 2009-2010 by the IOC. Some other authorities continue to classify the red-tailed leaflove in the genus Pyrrhurus. Alternate names for the red-tailed leaflove include the African leaflove, common leaflove, leaflove and plain leaflove.

Subspecies
Two subspecies are recognized:
 Uele leaflove (P. s. scandens) - Swainson, 1837: Found from Gambia and Senegal to northern Cameroon 
 Gabon leaflove (P. s. orientalis) - (Hartlaub, 1883): Originally described as a separate species in the genus Xenocichla (a synonym for Bleda). Found from northern Cameroon to southern Sudan, central Uganda, western Tanzania and southern Democratic Republic of the Congo

Distribution and habitat
The red-tailed leaflove is found across western and central Africa. Its natural habitats are subtropical or tropical moist lowland forests and moist savanna.

References

External links
Image at ADW

Phyllastrephus
red-tailed leaflove
Birds of Sub-Saharan Africa
red-tailed leaflove
Taxonomy articles created by Polbot
Taxobox binomials not recognized by IUCN